The Beauty of the Alhambra is a 1989 Cuban drama film directed by Enrique Pineda Barnet. The film was selected as the Cuban entry for the Best Foreign Language Film at the 63rd Academy Awards, but was not accepted as a nominee.

Cast
 Beatriz Valdés as Rachel
 Omar Valdés as Federico
 César Évora as Amante Rachel
 Carlos Cruz as Adolfito
 Isabel Moreno as La mejicana
 Jorge Martínez as Jorge

See also
 List of Cuban films
 List of submissions to the 63rd Academy Awards for Best Foreign Language Film
 List of Cuban submissions for the Academy Award for Best Foreign Language Film

References

External links
 

1989 films
1989 crime drama films
Cuban drama films
1980s Spanish-language films